Eastern Samar National Comprehensive High School (ESNCHS) is located in Borongan, Eastern Samar, Philippines. Formerly named Borongan National High School, Eastern Samar National Comprehensive High School was shortly established after the issuance of Republic Act 4221, "Providing for the Division of Samar Island into Three Provinces: Samar, Eastern Samar and Northern Samar." ESNCHS is the largest high school in the Province of Eastern Samar in both population and school area size. It is also considered the flagship high school of Eastern Samar.

One of the most notable features of the high school is its oval, the school park, the gymnasium, the DOST laboratory, the computer laboratory and the administration building.

Among the most notable organizations within ESNCHS are:

ESNCHS Rondalla – It enjoyed championships in the whole Eastern Visayas Region and represented it a couple of times in the National Music Competitions for Young Artists (NAMCYA) Finals held in the Cultural Center of the Philippines, Manila.
ESNCHS Ensemble – It was able to send many competitors to the NAMCYA Finals in Manila getting spots in 3rd Place and the semi-finals.
ESNCHS Speakers’ Guild – Recently revived last 2006, the ESNCHS Speakers’ Guild once enjoyed a 10-year undefeated feat in the Provincial Choral Speech Championships from 1991 - 2000. The Guild disbanded a few months after winning the title. It won the title once again last year after its recent revival.
ESNCHS Drum and Lyre Corps – One of the clubs which ESNCHS is much known for. Enjoyed a 9-year dominance in the Provincial Drum and Lyre Corps Championships from 1994 - 2002. The ESNCHS DLC disbanded around early 2003 and was revived last 2007. Last year, it won again the said title after its revival. Lorrie Emmanuel Arago is the coach.
ESNCHS Music Theatre – Established 2006, its members and trainers were from many different clubs of the high school who worked together in competing for the First Rizal National Festival of Excellence Music Theatre Competition. It had to win the District, Provincial, Regional and the Island Group (Visayas) championships for it to be able to join the National Finals held at the GSIS Theatre in Pasig, Metro Manila. The group was among the finalists and landed 4th Place.
ESNCHS Shuttlers (Badminton Team) – Established 2004, it immediately was able to send participants to the Eastern Visayas Regional Athletic Association Finals. Last 2007, it clinched for the first time the overall championship in the said games winning 4 of 5 slots, giving the chance to represent the region in the Palarong Pambansa (National Games) in Puerto Princesa, Palawan.

ESNCHS has no official academic teams but a lot of its individual students typically excel in academic competitions reaching the regional level, national level and even international level finals like the ACA 2008 International Online Contest which awarded ESNCHS an Honorable Mention and the AFS-YES Exchange Student Scholarships were ESNCHS successfully sent 2 candidates to the US, namely Creightania Coles and Reginald James Lorico

References

High schools in the Philippines
Schools in Eastern Samar
Borongan